Kalyanpura may refer to:

 Kalyanpura, Bhopal, a village in Madhya Pradesh, India
 Kalyanpura, Udupi, a village in Karnataka, India
 Kalyanpura (Ahmedabad), a neighbourhood in Ahmedabad, India

See also 
 Kalyanpur (disambiguation)